Smathers is a surname, and may refer to

 Bruce Smathers (born 1943), American politician, son of George Smathers
 George Smathers (1913–2007), American politician, nephew of William H. Smathers
 James Fields Smathers (1888–1967), American typewriter inventor
 Jason Smathers, AOL employee convicted of selling customer email addresses
 O. K. Smathers (1914–1997), American archer
 Patrick Smathers, American mayor
 William H. Smathers (1891–1955), American politician

See also
 George A. Smathers Libraries, University of Florida
 Smathers Beach, Florida
 Smithers (name)
 Smothers, a surname